Johann Heinrich Flemer (16 February 1888 in Amsterdam – 12 August 1955 in The Hague) was a Dutch gymnast who competed in the 1908 Summer Olympics. He was part of the Dutch gymnastics team, which finished seventh in the team event. In the individual all-around competition he finished 90th.

References

External links
 

1888 births
1955 deaths
Dutch male artistic gymnasts
Gymnasts at the 1908 Summer Olympics
Olympic gymnasts of the Netherlands
Gymnasts from Amsterdam